Vicia anatolica (syn. Vicia hajastana) is a species of flowering plant in the vetch genus Vicia, family Fabaceae. It is native to Crimea, the Caucasus, Turkey, Iran, Turkmenistan, and Kyrgyzstan. As its synonym Vicia hajastana it is used in studies of cytoskeletal structures and other cellular functions since it is amenable to laboratory media culturing.

References

anatolica
Flora of the Crimean Peninsula
Flora of the Caucasus
Flora of Turkey
Flora of Iran
Flora of Turkmenistan
Flora of Kyrgyzstan
Plants described in 1927